The Taiwan Corporate Sustainability Awards (TCSA) is a corporate sustainability award in Taiwan. It awards outstanding Taiwanese companies and foreign companies operating in Taiwan for their contribution to sustainability. The award is hosted by the Taiwan Institute for Sustainable Energy.

History
The award was firstly held in 2008.

See also
 Sustainability

References

External links
 Facebook - 台灣永續能源研究基金會 Taiwan Institute for Sustainable Energy (TAISE)

Taiwanese awards
2008 establishments in Taiwan